Norsesund is a bimunicipal locality situated in Alingsås Municipality and Lerum Municipality in Västra Götaland County, Sweden. It had 274 inhabitants in 2010.

Subdivisions
Gallvik is a hamlet outside Norsesund situated in Lerum Municipality.

References 

Populated places in Västra Götaland County
Populated places in Alingsås Municipality
Populated places in Lerum Municipality